Trirhabda borealis is a species of skeletonizing leaf beetle in the family Chrysomelidae. It is found in North America.

Subspecies
These two subspecies belong to the species Trirhabda borealis:
 Trirhabda borealis borealis
 Trirhabda borealis indigoptera Blake

References

Further reading

External links

 

Galerucinae
Articles created by Qbugbot
Beetles described in 1931
Taxa named by Doris Holmes Blake